Golden Swallow is a 1968 Hong Kong film directed by Chang Cheh. The film is a sequel to Come Drink With Me.

Plot 
Golden Swallow is forced into violence when a figure from her mysterious past goes on a killing rampage while leaving evidence that holds her responsible. Golden Swallow gets involved with a love triangle involving a mad, but righteous, swordsman named Silver Roc and a gentle warrior named Golden Whip. The three team up to conquer the evil forces of the martial world, but their joint venture only lasts so long, due to the two men's egos. Ultimately, a duel to the death is planned between them, leaving Golden Swallow caught between two men, both of whom she admires.

Cast
 Cheng Pei-pei as Golden Swallow
 Jimmy Wang as Silver Roc
 Lo Lieh as Golden Whip
 Chao Hsin-yen as Mei Niang
 Wu Ma as Flying Fox
 Yeung Chi-hing as Poison Dragon
 Hoh Ban as Golden Dragon Branch chief

Production
Director Chang Cheh stated that for Golden Swallow he disregarded a historical backdrop for the film to give the story more creative freedom. Chang Cheh was his first time partnering with Ni Kuang to write the script. Cheh said that Ni "quickly picked up the techniques of scriptwriting—The Invincible Fist (1969) was simply a masterstroke by a gifted writer! The ensemble of characters was each vividly portrayed and the script depicted the four seasons with a sensibility rarely found in Chinese films. I also heightened the romantic sub-plot of 'The Golden Swallow' which centres on the triangular love relationship between Jimmy Wang Yu, Lo Lieh and Cheng Pei-pei". The Shaw Brothers intended to base the script on the character of Golden Swallow character in King Hu's Come Drink with Me. After several script re-writes, the characters bear little to no resemblance to the original characters from Come Drink With Me. Chang also stated he took influence from Japanese cinema at the period, and chose to shoot the film entirely in Japan.

Release
Golden Swallow was distributed in Hong Kong on April 4, 1968. The film was among the ten top-grossing Mandarin films of 1968.

Reception
From contemporary reviews, "Harr." of Variety stated the film was in competition with Italian Western as "one of the bloodiest films ever released" and that "the nauseating degree of violence and bloodshed in this film recommends it only for sadistic, exploitation situations".

From a retrospective review, Donald Guarisco of AllMovie wrote that the film was "full of outrageous bloodletting, over-the-top melodrama and plenty of machismo" and depending on the viewers tolerance of these elements, the film "offers plenty of rewards for those who can appreciate action filmmaking at its most extreme". Guarisco found that "the plotting doesn't always make sense and Cheng Pei-Pei [...] is unfortunately sidelined by the film's male-centric story line. That said, Hsia Yu-Yen delivers all the thrills a kung-fu film should offer and is well worth the time for genre enthusiasts thanks to its historic importance as an early Chang Cheh classic".

It was the third-highest grossing film in Hong Kong for the year behind You Only Live Twice and Dragon Inn.

References

External links
 
 
 

Hong Kong martial arts films
1968 films
Wuxia films
Shaw Brothers Studio films
Films directed by Chang Cheh
Films shot in Japan
1960s Mandarin-language films